Martinci is a village in Serbia. It is situated in the Sremska Mitrovica municipality, Srem District, Vojvodina province. The village has a Serb ethnic majority and its population numbering 3,639 people (2002 census).
Krofnijada jedina u Srbiji se održava u ovom selu svake godine.

Name
In Serbian, the village is known as Martinci (Мартинци), and in Hungarian as  Szávaszentmárton. It was named after Saint Martin. The name of the village in Serbian is plural.

History

It is one of the oldest places in Vojvodina. During Roman rule, the village was known as Budalia and was a place of birth of Roman emperor Traianus Decius (249-251).

Gallery

Historical population

1961: 4,396
1971: 4,003
1981: 3,975
1991: 3,663

See also
List of places in Serbia
List of cities, towns and villages in Vojvodina
Martinci railway station

References
Slobodan Ćurčić, Broj stanovnika Vojvodine, Novi Sad, 1996.

External links 

Official site
Sremski Oglasi
Oglasi
Martinci

 

Populated places in Syrmia
Sremska Mitrovica